John William Deathridge (born 21 October 1944, in Birmingham) is a British musicologist. He was educated at King Edward's School, Birmingham, and at Lincoln College, Oxford (MA, DPhil) culminating with a dissertation on Wagner's sketches for Rienzi, and is currently Emeritus Professor of Music at King's College London. Deathridge lives in Cambridge.

Professional life
After graduation he worked as full-time director of music at St Wolfgang, Munich, where he continued his research on Wagner and acted as a conductor and broadcaster. Deathridge has also taught at Princeton University and the University of Chicago and worked as an editor of the Wagner complete edition. he was also fellow and director of studies in music at King's College, Cambridge.

Deathridge is regarded as one of the world's foremost Wagner experts and a noted authority on Beethoven. Now King Edward VII Professor of Music at King's College London, as well as a former Head of the Department of Music at that institution, he has been active as a conductor, organ recitalist and piano accompanist. His career includes being a radio and television broadcaster and a reviewer for scholarly music journals in Germany and the United Kingdom.

Between 2005 and 2008 he served as president of the Royal Musical Association, Britain's foremost learned music society.  Music and social theory is a keen research interest of Deathridge, in particular the work of Theodor W. Adorno. However, his main area of research remains 19th and 20th-century German music, especially Wagner.

Since December 2011, John Deathridge is member of the board of the European Academy of Music Theatre.

Selected works
 With Carl Dahlhaus, The New Grove Wagner, 1984, Macmillan Press
 Introduction author, The Family Letters of Richard Wagner, trans. William Ashton Ellis, 1992, University of Michigan Press
 Translation editor, Wagner Handbook, Edited by Ulrich Muller and Peter Wapnewski. Harvard University Press.
 Wagner: Beyond Good and Evil, 2008, University of California Press

Notes and references

External links
European Academy of Music Theatre

1944 births
Living people
People educated at King Edward's School, Birmingham
Alumni of Lincoln College, Oxford
Princeton University faculty
University of Chicago faculty
Academics of King's College London
Fellows of King's College, Cambridge
British musicologists
People from Birmingham, West Midlands
Wagner scholars